Trerein "Tre" E. Roberson (born October 22, 1992) is a professional gridiron football defensive back for the Calgary Stampeders of the Canadian Football League (CFL). He was signed by the Minnesota Vikings as an undrafted free agent following the 2016 NFL Draft. He then played for the Stampeders until he signed with the Chicago Bears in 2020. Prior to entering the NFL, Roberson was a collegiate quarterback at Indiana University and Illinois State University. Roberson had a 3–4 record for his career as the starting quarterback at Indiana and a 23–5 record for Illinois State.

Roberson played high school football at Lawrence Central High School, where he was a two sport athlete, and won the 2010 Indiana Mr. Football. He committed to Indiana University on April 10, 2010, and became the first ever true freshman to start at quarterback for the Hoosiers. In June 2014, Roberson announced his intentions to leave Indiana and transfer to Illinois State University of the FCS.

Early years
Roberson was born on October 22, 1992 to Gajuan Roberson and Monica Highbaugh. He began his high school career as a student at North Central High School, where he was a member of the basketball team. After his freshman year, he transferred to Lawrence Central High School in Indianapolis, Indiana, where he was a member of the football (coached by Jayson West) and basketball (coached by J.R. Shelt) teams. In his first football season with Lawrence Central, he was thrust into the starting quarterback role in just the second game of the season after the regular starter left the game with an injury. With his team trailing 14–0, and playing North Central, Roberson went on to lead the team to a 28–16 second half victory. Roberson went on to be the starter for the next 3 years leading his team to a 13–2 record and an appearance in the Indiana Class 5-A football state championship game his senior season, losing 38–19 to Fishers High School. With outstanding numbers during his senior season, which saw him complete 144 passes on 237 attempts for 2,611 yards, 24 touchdowns and four interceptions, while also running for 1,950 rushing yards and 21 scores, Roberson was named the 2010 Indiana Mr. Football. He received 19 of 50 first place votes from the Indiana Football Coaches Association. Roberson beat out Fishers High School quarterback/defensive back Koby Orris, who led his team to the 5A title over Roberson's Lawrence Central team, was second with 13 votes. He was also named to the Associated Press All-State football team 2010.

Recruiting
Roberson committed to Indiana University on April 10, 2010. Roberson was offered football scholarships by Purdue and Toledo, while also gaining interest from Oregon, Illinois and Ball State, but he quickly signed with the Hoosiers after they offered him a scholarship. On November 28, 2010, Indiana fired their head coach Bill Lynch, who had recruited Roberson. On December 7, the Hoosiers announced that they had hired Oklahoma's offensive coordinator, Kevin Wilson, as their new head coach. Wilson made it clear that he wanted to keep most of the players that had committed to Lynch's staff, and Roberson did not change his mind about coming to Indiana and signed with the Hoosiers on National Signing Day.

College career

Indiana

2011
Roberson arrived on the Indiana University campus on the summer of 2011, and was one of five candidates to replace starter Ben Chappell, who had graduated. Within a few weeks it was between Roberson, Edward Wright-Baker and Dusty Kiel for the starting spot, and come September 3, Wright-Baker was named the team's starter with Roberson as the 3rd stringer. For the five games of the season, Roberson appeared in two games where he was used a wildcat quarterback running for 7 yards on 3 carries. During a October 10 game against Illinois, Roberson came in after Dusty Kiel proved to be ineffective. Completing 11 of 17 passes for 148 yards while throwing an interception. His play was impressive enough to cause a stir amongst the media, but with the Hoosiers next game being at No. 4 Wisconsin, it was decided that Wright-Baker would again start for the Hoosiers. The Hoosiers lost 59–7 against the Badgers with Roberson seeing playing time in relief of Wright-Baker. He completed two passes on just five attempts for 10 yards. On Friday, November 21, the Hoosier program learned that top recruit, Gunner Kiel, had decommited from the program, and would explore other options. Without Gunner's commitment, the Hoosiers seemed to place their future in Roberson's hands. The following day Roberson was named the Hoosiers starting quarterback against the Iowa Hawkeyes. With his first snap, he became the first true freshman to start at quarterback for the Hoosiers in program history. In the game, he completed 16-of-24 passes for 196 yards and a touchdown. He also rushed the ball 15 times for 82 yards. For his efforts, he was named the Big Ten freshman of the week.

2012
The Hoosiers began their 2012 campaign at home against Indiana State. Roberson had one rushing touchdown and completed 26 passes for 280 yards including a 71 yard touchdown strike to wide receiver Shane Wynn. Indiana won the game 24–17. Against Massachusetts, Roberson broke his left leg and missed the remainder of the season. Prior to his injury, he had rushed for 114 yards with two touchdowns and had completed 7 of 14 passes for 88 yards with one touchdown and one interception during the game. During his absence, Indiana's record was 2–8. He was replaced by Cameron Coffman and Nathan Sudfeld. Because Roberson was injured so early on in the season, he was granted a medical redshirt, so he would still have three years of eligibility remaining.

2013
Roberson entered the 2013 Spring Game as the starting quarterback.  Throughout the first few weeks of the season, Roberson and Nate Sudfeld switched off with the quarterbacking duties.  In the opening win against Indiana State, Roberson started the game and threw two touchdowns and 71 yards through the air before Sudfeld was subbed in.  He appeared briefly in the second game against Navy in which the Hoosiers would lose, and rushed for a touchdown in the third game, a win against the Bowling Green Falcons.  In the fourth game of the season against the Missouri Tigers, Roberson entered the game in the third quarter and completed 8 of 14 passes for 148 yards, a touchdown through the air and another on the ground.  Indiana lost the game 45–28.  Throughout the remainder of the season, Roberson appeared on and off until the final game of the season against the Purdue Boilermakers.  In that game, Roberson threw for 273 and 6 touchdown passes, and led IU to a 56–36 victory over their arch rivals.

Illinois State

2014
After finishing spring practice in Bloomington, it was expected that Roberson would continue to split snaps with teammate Nate Sudfeld in the upcoming season. However, on June 11, Roberson announced his decision to transfer from Indiana. In doing so, he became the second former starting QB to leave the team in offseason after Cam Coffman's transfer to Wyoming. Just two days later, Roberson tweeted that he would be transferring to Illinois State University in Normal, Illinois to join head coach Brock Spack and the Redbirds. Because ISU is an FCS school, Roberson was eligible to play immediately as a redshirt junior with two years of NCAA eligibility remaining. After winning the job for starting quarterback, Roberson began the 2014 campaign with a 62–0 blowout victory over Mississippi Valley State. In the game, he passed for 204 yards and two touchdowns, rushed for 41 yards and two touchdowns, and was finally rested for backup Blake Winkler. Roberson and fellow teammate running back Marshaun Coprich would lead the team to a 13–2 record on the season, making it all the way to the division championship before losing 29–27 to North Dakota State.

2015
The Redbirds opened up the 2015 season against the Iowa Hawkeyes at Kinnick Stadium.  After much hype for the new season, Illinois State was defeated by a score of 31–14.  Roberson completed just 5 of 12 passes for 49 yards before leaving the game due to cramps and being replaced by Jake Kolbe.  The Redbirds would rebound the following two weeks, defeating Morgan State 67–14 and Eastern Illinois 34–31.  The Redbirds finished the regular season with a record of 9-2, and then advanced to the NCAA Division I FCS Playoffs.  After defeating Western Illinois by a score of 36-19, they would go on to lose to Richmond by a score of 39-27 and ending their season with a 10-3 record.  Roberson finished with 18 touchdown passes to 9 interceptions on the season and adding 11 more scores on the ground.

Statistics

Professional career

Pre-draft
Due to eligibility constraints, Roberson's collegiate career ended after January 2016. Although he was eligible for the NFL Draft, he was not invited to the combine and was not expected to be drafted.

Minnesota Vikings
After switching to cornerback, Roberson worked out at Illinois State's Pro Day and was offered a tryout by the Minnesota Vikings after the 2016 NFL Draft. On May 9, 2016, it was announced that Roberson had signed a contract with the Minnesota Vikings. Despite a strong performance in the preseason, he was released by the Vikings as part of final roster cuts on September 3, 2016. Shortly afterwards, Roberson was signed to the team's practice squad. On September 6, 2016, he was released from the Vikings' practice squad. On September 13, he was re-signed to their practice squad. He was released on October 5, 2016 and re-signed again on October 18. He signed a reserve/futures contract with the Vikings on January 2, 2017.

On September 2, 2017, Roberson was waived by the Vikings.

Calgary Stampeders
Roberson signed with the Calgary Stampeders in May 2018. He played in his first career professional game on June 16, 2018 against the Hamilton Tiger-Cats. He played in 16 regular season games and two post-season games in 2018 and won his first Grey Cup championship as a member of the 106th Grey Cup winning team.

Chicago Bears
On January 28, 2020, Roberson signed the largest CFL to NFL deal with the Chicago Bears since Cameron Wake signed a four-year contract worth up to $4.9 million with the Miami Dolphins. He was waived with a non-football injury designation by the team on July 28; he had broken his foot while training during the offseason. He was placed on the reserve/non-football injury list after clearing waivers the next day.

On August 31, 2021, Roberson was waived/injured by the Bears and placed on injured reserve. He was released on September 6.

Calgary Stampeders (II)
On October 19, 2021, it was announced that Roberson had re-signed with the Calgary Stampeders. After joining the Stamps midway through the season Roberson played in only three games in the regular season. He made nine tackles and created a forced fumble. Following the season, on December 14, 2021, Roberson and the Stampeders announced they had agreed to a contract extension through the 2023 season. The following season Roberson played in five games for the Stamps before suffering a knee injury which would cause him to miss the remainder of the season. In those five games Roberson contributed with 17 defensive tackles, one interception and one forced fumble.

Personal life
Roberson's grandfather, Larry Highbaugh (1950–2017), played as a defensive back and ran track at Indiana University from 1968 to 1971, where he won the 100 and 220, long jump and sprint relay as a sophomore at Big Tens, becoming the first athlete to win the "Jesse Owens Slam". He also played briefly with the Dallas Cowboys, spent 13 years in the Canadian Football League playing for the BC Lions and Edmonton Eskimos and was inducted into the Canadian Football Hall of Fame in the Class of 2004.

References

External links
 
 Calgary Stampeders bio
 Indiana profile

1992 births
Living people
American football quarterbacks
Illinois State Redbirds football players
Indiana Hoosiers football players
Players of American football from Indianapolis
Players of Canadian football from Indianapolis
Minnesota Vikings players
American football cornerbacks
Canadian football defensive backs
Calgary Stampeders players
American players of Canadian football
Chicago Bears players